Central Europe is a region of Europe. The culture may refer to:

Culture of Switzerland
Culture of Liechtenstein
Culture of Germany
Culture of Austria
Culture of Poland
Culture of the Czech Republic
Culture of Slovakia
Culture of Hungary
Culture of Slovenia
Culture of Croatia

See also
Culture of Europe
Cultural policies of the European Union